When Pigs Fly is the first studio album by an alternative hip hop duo The Chicharones, consisting of Canadian rapper Josh Martinez and American rapper Sleep. It was released on Camobear Records in 2005.

Music 
When Pigs Fly features production from Pale Soul, EarthFireMusic, Vertigo, Foundation, Maker, Samix, and Moves.

Track listing

References

External links
 

2005 albums
The Chicharones albums